Elizabeth Fallaize (3 June 1950 – 6 December 2009) was a British academic who was Pro-Vice Chancellor of the University of Oxford and a French studies scholar.

Fallaize was educated at Dame Allan's School, Newcastle upon Tyne. After graduating with First Class honours in French from the University of Exeter in 1972, she was appointed in 1975 as a lecturer at the School of Languages at Wolverhampton Polytechnic, before moving to Birmingham University's French department in 1977.  In 1989 she was appointed an Official Fellow of St John's College, Oxford, the first woman ever to hold this post.

She was a noted expert on the life and works of Simone de Beauvoir.

Fallaize died of motor neurone disease in 2009.

References

External links
 Obituary of Elizabeth Fallaize, The Times, 6 January 2010

1950 births
2009 deaths
People educated at Dame Allan's School
Alumni of the University of Exeter
Academics of the University of Wolverhampton
Academics of the University of Birmingham
Fellows of St John's College, Oxford
Pro-Vice-Chancellors of the University of Oxford